"The Secret War of Lisa Simpson" is the twenty-fifth episode and the season finale of the eighth season of the American animated television series The Simpsons. It first aired on the Fox network in the United States on May 18, 1997. Bart gets sent to a military academy as punishment for bad behavior. While visiting the academy, Lisa sees that the school is far more challenging than hers and she decides that she wants to attend as well. It was directed by Mike B. Anderson, written by Richard Appel and featured Willem Dafoe in a guest spot as the school's commandant.

Plot
After a day watching mind-numbing videos in class, Lisa worries that her education is not challenging enough. Bart's class goes on a field trip to the Springfield Police Department, where Bart finds a room with several megaphones. By placing them all end-to-end and speaking into one, he amplifies his voice enough to create a sonic shock wave that shatters all the glass in Springfield. Chief Wiggum suggests sending Bart to military school to correct his behavior. Under the ruse they are going to Disneyland, Homer and Marge drive the kids to Rommelwood Military School; while visiting a poetry class, Lisa decides to enroll as well in order to experience the challenge she seeks. Homer and Marge reluctantly agree to her plan and depart, ignoring Bart's pleas to let him come home.

As the school's first female cadet, Lisa is assigned a barracks to herself, angering the corps of cadets. After she and Bart endure hazing, Bart is eventually accepted by the other cadets and distances himself from his sister. Lonely, Lisa considers going home, but decides to see it through. As the school year comes to a close, the Commandant reveals the final test for the students: the "Eliminator", a hand-over-hand crawl across a rope suspended high above thorn bushes. Lisa fears she will not be able to complete the task, but Bart helps her train in secret.

On the day of the test, Lisa is the last to cross the Eliminator. She loses her grip on the rope and is in danger of falling as the cadets jeer her, but Bart cheers her on and she successfully completes the task. The other cadets vow to make the rest of the semester unbearable for Bart, but realize that their graduation ceremony is only three hours away. The Commandant awards Lisa a medal engraved "For Satisfactory Completion of the Second Grade". Homer and Marge again promise to take her and Bart to Disneyland, but instead drive them to a dentist's office.

Production

The episode was written by Richard Appel, but the idea of Bart and Lisa attending a military academy had previously been pitched, and had been floating around since 1991. The idea had not yet been used as an episode plot, because the writers had not felt comfortable with taking Bart and Lisa to a strange place early in the series. Because this is the season finale, Yeardley Smith returned to the series for the first time since "In Marge We Trust" since she caught the flu after recording her lines in that episode, despite having brief lines recorded at home and being credited in the previous episodes "Homer's Enemy" and "The Simpsons Spin-Off Showcase".

During the scene where the Commandant is talking, there is a brief shot of Lisa blinking. As there had been an error in the final print of the episode, the shot was animated, painted and shot on May 16, 1997, the Friday before the episode's airdate. The spiky blond-haired boy, who runs towards the Eliminator while screaming, is a caricature of director Mike B. Anderson.

Reception
The episode originally aired on May 18, 1997, as the season finale, along with a rerun of "The Springfield Files." The episode was mistakenly anticipated by some as being about Lisa launching "a legal battle" to enroll at the military school. In its original broadcast, "The Secret War of Lisa Simpson" finished 47th in ratings for the week of May 12–18, 1997, with a Nielsen rating of 8.3, equivalent to approximately 8.1 million viewing households. It was the second highest-rated show on the Fox network that week, following The X-Files.

Warren Martyn and Adrian Wood, the authors of the book I Can't Believe It's a Bigger and Better Updated Unofficial Simpsons Guide, disliked the episode, writing that it was "very dull" and that Dafoe was not used well. However, Dafoe is one of show runner Josh Weinstein's favorite guest stars. Ian Johnson argued Dafoe's casting was "rare" and "somewhat offbeat".

Journalist Raju Mudhar also wrote that in this episode, "The Simpsons have succinctly laid out our eventual future." This referred to the rise of robots in the real world and the quote from this episode:
"The wars of the future will not be fought on the battlefield or at sea. They will be fought in space, or possibly on top of a very tall mountain. In either case, most of the actual fighting will be done by small robots. And as you go forth today remember always your duty is clear: To build and maintain those robots."

Merchandise
The episode was one of four in 1999 released on a VHS (Re-released on DVD in 2005) called Bart Wars focused on crosses between The Simpsons and Star Wars. However, one critic wrote that with this episode and "Marge Be Not Proud" and "Dog of Death," both of which are also on the DVD, the "Star Wars connection" is "tangential at best."

References

External links

The Simpsons (season 8) episodes
1997 American television episodes